is a Japanese television series that ran periodically on Fuji Television from 1994 until its final episodes (specials) in 2006. It was written by Japanese playwright Kōki Mitani and is often referred to as the Japanese version of Columbo.

The series is a police detective drama starring actor Masakazu Tamura as Furuhata Ninzaburo and Masahiko Nishimura as his stereotypically bumbling sidekick, Shintaro Imaizumi. The program aired weekly and featured a guest villain each time, usually a famous talent in Japan. Pop-stars like Takuya Kimura of SMAP (boy-band), television hosts like Sanma Akashiya (variety) and even sports figures like Ichiro Suzuki (baseball) have been featured on this program. It was one of the most popular television dramas in the history of Japanese television, having spawned several seasons and TV specials.

Plot patterns
Furuhata opens each episode with a humorous monologue that, at first, appears to be a non-sequitur, but really contains a hint or clue relevant to the following mystery. Then the opening credits appear.

The viewers witness the ingenious murder and watch as the killer covers up the crime (usually by staging the murder as an accident). The murder is then discovered, and Furuhata is usually called in by the police to investigate; but sometimes he just coincidentally happens to be nearby when the crime is discovered. The murderer hangs around the scene of the crime to misdirect the investigation by throwing in several red herrings.

Despite the killer's interference, Furuhata spends the episode trying to spot the real evidence and determining exactly how the crime was committed. Furuhata does this by obnoxiously hanging around his chief suspect (much to the exasperation of the criminal, of course). Just before the final act, Furuhata "breaks the fourth wall" and challenges the audience to guess:

(A) what tiny slip-up the killer made which let Furuhata know who the killer was.

(B) what clue(s) Furuhata spotted which led him to figure out how the crime was committed.

(C) what ingenious trap Furuhata will use to get the killer to confess his / her crime.

In the final act, Furuhata cleverly ensnares the killer using a trap (C); then explains A, B

The charm of the story is that while the audience already knows the killer's identity from the episode's outset - it's still up to the viewer to follow along with Furuhata's investigation and spot the clues which will lead to the solving of the crime.

The character of Furuhata

Looks and mannerisms
He wears a black suit, usually over a black shirt but never wears a tie.
He usually has awkward posture - he stoops at a 45 degree angle at the waist and carries his hands in front of his chest like a mouse on hind paws.
Since he stoops, he tilts his head and looks up at the person he speaks to, rather than at eye level.
His hair is shoulder-length (unusual for a Japanese cop) but always excellently coiffed.
He has a quirky way of speaking – he speaks in a halting, mumbling tone; elongates his vowels abnormally; uses the honorific, ultra-polite register of Japanese when speaking and hums while thinking.
He has odd "tics", like poking his forehead with his forefinger when thinking.

The character is said to have been based on the fictional character LAPD lieutenant Columbo.

Shintaro Imaizumi
The character of Shintaro Imaizumi (今泉 慎太郎 Imaizumi Shintarō), portrayed by Masahiko Nishimura, is the bumbling, inept sidekick of Furuhata. Imaizumi tends to be quite childlike and very passive. Imaizumi somewhat resembles Charlie Brown in personality.

His character not only acts as comic relief, though, but acts as the Watson to Furuhata's Sherlock Holmes. Through his naïveté and ineptitude, Imaizumi often falls for the red herrings left by the killer and comes to the conclusion that the murderer intended. Furuhata will then scold Imaizumi, explaining why he shouldn't have jumped to such a conclusion. Thus, he tends to act as a sounding board for Furuhata to explain his theories and acts as a proxy for the viewing audience.

Furuhata can be downright mean when it comes to Imaizumi. Furuhata is often visibly annoyed by Imaizumi's incompetence and often hurls insults at Imaizumi or gives Imaizumi demeaning tasks. Furuhata constantly slaps Imaizumi on his forehead.

Imaizumi still lives with his grandmother and counts knitting, magic tricks and flower arrangement among his hobbies. He loves meat-stuffed peppers, his favorite movie is Grease, his favorite group is ABBA, his favorite Golden Half member is Eva and his favorite song is Dancing Queen.

In season 2, Shintaro Imaizumi was featured in a series of 7 minute skits which aired after the main "Furuhata Ninzaburo" episode.

Other recurring characters
Otokichi Mukojima (向島 音吉 Mukōjima Otokichi) - aka Otokichi Higashikunibaru (東国原　音吉), played by Takashi Kobayashi (小林 隆 Kobayashi Takashi). Mukojima is a patrolman that often greets Furuhata at the scene of the crime. His first appearance is in Episode 2 and he is the only recurring character (besides Furuhata and Imaizumi) to have appeared in every season of the show. Mukojima is the subject of a long running gag in the show. Despite formally introducing himself in several episodes, Furuhata often forgets Mukojima's name. Furuhata tries to memorize it but by the next episode, has forgotten it. In a "Imaizumi Shintaro" skit, it is revealed that Otokichi adopted his wife's last name because he married into a Zaibatsu (extremely wealthy, established) family with no male heir. FINALLY, Furuhata manages to memorize Otokichi's last name at the finale of Series 2. However, it is then that Mukojima reveals he got a divorce and changes back to his original last name (which is obscure, long and cumbersome) - Higashikunibaru. Afterwards, Otokichi has to remind everyone that his name is now Higashikunibaru. Later, he reconciles with his wife and changes his surname back to Mukojima. In a " Final Series" (2006) episode, it is revealed that Mukojima is baseball superstar Ichiro's half-brother (fictional). In the Chugakusei Furuhata (2008) special - adult Mukojima is shown to have a son. Strangely, the 2008 Furuhata Chugakusei special (which was written 14 years after Series 1), it is revealed that Furuhata and Otokichi were friends for a few months during Junior High. Otokichi's last name at the time is Mukojima, not Higashikunibaru. Though its implied that they may have been in periodic contact before Series 1, Furuhata does not appear to recognize Otokitchi when they meet in Episode 2.
Mantaro Kuwabara (桑原 万太郎 Kuwabara Mantarō), played by Toshihito Ito, is a forensic scientist who works at the crime lab. He appears in some Series 1, Series 2 and Series 3 episodes but was featured prominently in all of the Season 2 Imaizumi Shintaro skits. These skits often featured Kuwabara consoling Imaizumi after he vents his frustration with his treatment during the episode. Sadly, Ito died in 2002 of a brain hemorrhage
Haga Keiji (芳賀 啓二 Haga Keiji) played by Shirai Akira (白井 晃 Shirai Akira), is a detective who has made several appearances in the series. His appearances include: episodes 14, 17, 25, 27 and two Shintaro Imaizumi skits. Haga has filled in for Imaizumi when the latter has been unavailable (when Imaizumi was imprisoned on suspicion of murder and when Imaizumi was trapped on a ferris wheel with a bomb). Imaizumi and Haga are bitter rivals and extremely competitive with one another for Furuhata's attention. Haga is a much more competent than Imaizumi and Furuhata has said he would like Haga to replace Imaizumi as his partner. In the 1999 Special, Haga is now Head of the Detective Division, and he assigns Saionji to become Furuhata's new partner.
Mamoru Saionji (西園寺 守 Saionji Mamoru), played by Masanori Ishii (石井 正則 Ishi'i Masanori), appears in the third and fourth season of Furuhata Ninzaburo. He is a 'second' sidekick to Furuhata and a direct contrast to Imaizumi. Saionji is everything Imaizumi isn't. Saionji is serious, logical and competent as opposed to the silly, immature, and inept Imaizumi. Saionji is a huge admirer of Furuhata and emulates his skills as a detective. As the season progresses, he has become quite the excellent detective whose skills of observation and deduction nearly rival Furuhata's. Saionji is only 5'2" tall but has remarked he is the tallest amongst his relatives.
 Hanada (花田) is a character played by Norito Yashima who appears in several Series 3 episodes as well as the 2004 Special. He is a bystander who randomly (and conveniently) appears when the detectives are at an impasse in their investigation. After overhearing the detectives' conversation, Hanada is able to accurately able to deduce the killer's motive or modus operandi. He is uncannily correct and disappears from the episode after he has made his point, leaving the detectives to find the hard evidence. He has appeared every time in different occupation. First, he was a waiter in a family restaurant (Episode 27), then a manager at a cafe (Episode 31), next a server in a pub (Episode 33), then a flight attendant (Episode 36), a taxi driver (Episode 38) and as an employee in the Japanese embassy to Spain (Episode 39). He also appears for a few seconds in a brief non-speaking cameo as the flight attendant in the January 2004 "Imaizumi Shintaro" skit which aired right after Episode 39. In Episode 39, Hanada reveals that the flight attendant in Episode 36 and 2004 Imaizumi skit is actually his older (twin?) brother.
Matsuzaka the Stage Director  (松阪 Matsuzaka) played by Isao Nonaka(野仲功 Nonaka Isao). Matsuzaka has appeared three times in the Furuhata series. He first appears as the stage director for SMAP's show in Episode 26. He reappears as the stage director for the "Rakugo" performance in Episode 28. By the time he meets Furuhata again in Episode 33 (directing an orchestral performance), he becomes exasperated - wondering if every performance he directs will end up in murder. Incidentally, Isao Nonaka appeared briefly in Episode 22 as a taxi driver driving Furuhata and the suspect to the bowling alley. It is not clear if the taxi driver might be Matsuzaka moonlighting in a different job (much like Hanada).

Episode list / Guest stars

Series 1 (1994)
The episode order is listed by order of the air date. However, the events of the episodes do not necessarily follow the same chronologic order.

Series 2 (1996)
The victim is not always shown, nor is he/she always listed by name in the credits. A credit is given here wherever possible. 
In the second season, the Shintaro Imaizumi special also begins.

Series 3 (1999)
A credit is given here wherever possible. 
In the third season, Saionji also joins the group of regular characters.

Final Series (2006)
The FINAL series (these episodes were written with intention to be Furuhata's final adventures) consisted of three 2-hour TV movie specials.

Please note the victim is not always shown, nor is he/she always listed by name in the credits. A credit is given here wherever possible.

Special Episodes
Most episodes of Furuhata Ninzaburo ran for 50 minutes (excluding commercial and news breaks); however, the show would periodically air extended length TV movie specials

Please note the victim is not always shown, nor is he/she always listed by name in the credits. A credit is given here wherever possible.

Imaizumi Shintaro comedic skits (January 10, 1996 ~ March 27, 1996; Jan 3, 2004) 
In the second season of the drama, Fuji TV produced a series of 7-minute comedic skits called "Imaizumi Shintaro" which followed the "Furuhata Ninzaburo" episode. These skits feature Imaizumi and his confidante Mantaro Kuwabara portrayed by Toshihito Ito . This series was immensely popular until the death of actor Ito in 2002. In the skits, meek and long suffering Imaizumi vents his anger and frustration about his treatment in the main episode. During the skits, he tried to prove that he is the superior detective, make prank calls to Furuhata, work up the (drunken) courage to tell Furuhata off, even plot the murder of Furuhata. However, the skit always ends with Imaizumi proving his ineptitude or losing his nerve and Kuwabara is forced to help escort his sobbing, spineless and broken friend out of the lab.

Despite the absence of Imaizumi, Saionji or Mukojima in the January 3, 2004 Furuhata Special; all three did appear in a 10-minute "Imaizumi" skit which aired later that night. Hanada also makes a brief cameo appearance

Young Furuhata Special (June 14, 2008)
During his last year in junior high, young Furuhata Ninzaburo, a bright but anti-social teenager reluctantly moves to small village with his single mom. His father abandoned the family years ago and his mother frequently stays out late working as a "snack-bar" hostess. Lonely and bored, young Furuhata, with the help of classmate Mukojima Otokichi, reads Sherlock Holmes and solves petty crimes. We see the origin and development of Furuhata's knack for observation, deduction and lie detection. Young Furuhata is played by Ryosuke Yamada and Young Mukojima is played by Tamoto Soran. Tamura Masakazu and Kobayashi Takashi make cameo appearances at the beginning and end of the episode, respectively. This special was written by Kōki Mitani. This show is considered canon, despite a few continuity errors with the earlier series.

References

External links
Furuhata Ninzaburo on IMDb
Official site  Japanese only

1994 Japanese television series debuts
2006 Japanese television series endings
Japanese drama television series
Fictional Japanese police detectives
Fuji TV dramas
Television shows written by Kôki Mitani
Japanese detective television drama series